David Sylvestre-Williams (born 1 October 1994) is a Canadian-Trinidadian former professional racing cyclist, who last rode for UCI Continental team . Williams turned professional on the UCI Asia Tour for Al Marakeb Cycling Team in 2016, and is the great-great-grandson of pan-Africanism human rights defender Henry Sylvester Williams.

Major results

2017
 1st Spinneys Dubai 92, UCI Gran Fondo World Series
2018
 3rd Overall Cyprus Gran Fondo, UCI Gran Fondo World Series

References

External links

1994 births
Living people
Canadian male cyclists
Sportspeople from Yellowknife
Trinidad and Tobago male cyclists